CVV may refer to:

 The abbreviation for Aircraft Carrier (Medium),  an American design for a conventional-powered aircraft carrier proposed in the 1970s
 Cache Valley Virus, a disease affecting ruminants in North America 
 Card Verification Value, also known as card security code, a security feature for credit cards
 Carl Van Vechten (1880–1964), Harlem Renaissance photographer and portrait artist
 Citrus variegation virus, a disease affecting citrus trees
 Cory V. Vidanes, commonly known as CVV, the Channel Head for ABS-CBN